Quercus segoviensis is a species of oak native to southern Mexico and northern Central America. It is commonly known as k’antulán.

Description
Quercus segoviensis is a small or medium-sized tree which grows up to 22 meters tall, with a trunk up to 40 cm in diameter.

Range and habitat
Quercus segoviensis is native to the mountains of southern Mexico and northern Central America. Its range includes the Sierra Madre de Oaxaca and eastern Sierra Madre del Sur of Mexico's Oaxaca state, the Chiapas Highlands of central Chiapas, the Sierra Madre de Chiapas of Chiapas and Guatemala, the Guatemalan Highlands, and the Chortis Highlands of El Salvador, Honduras, and Nicaragua, including Honduras' Montaña de Comayagua National Park.

It is often found as a canopy tree in montane oak and pine–oak forests and cloud forests between 750 and 2,500 meters elevation.

It is widely distributed in its native highlands. Much of its habitat has been disturbed by clearance for agriculture and livestock grazing and frequent human-set fires, but the species shows robust regeneration in cleared areas and along forest edges. Its conservation status is assesssed as least concern.

Uses
The tree produces a hard timber which is used for poles, fences, houses, tool handles, and for firewood.

References

segoviensis
Oaks of Mexico
Trees of Central America
Cloud forest flora of Mexico
Flora of the Central American pine–oak forests
Flora of the Central American montane forests
Flora of the Sierra Madre de Oaxaca
Flora of the Sierra Madre del Sur